Harold "Peter" Hardiman (20 February 1905 – 8 November 1971) was an Australian rules footballer who played with Geelong in the Victorian Football League (VFL).

Although his name was Harold he was known during his football career as Peter so there would be no confusion between him and teammate Harold Craven.

Hardiman played much of his career beside brother Les and was used mostly as a follower. A premiership player in 1931, he earned Victorian interstate selection in the same year. Six years later he played in another Geelong premiership.

He is credited as being one of the last players from the club to regularly use the place kick during games.

Notes

External links

1905 births
1971 deaths
Australian rules footballers from Victoria (Australia)
Australian Rules footballers: place kick exponents
Chilwell Football Club players
Geelong Football Club players
Geelong Football Club Premiership players
Two-time VFL/AFL Premiership players